Frenkie de Jong (born 12 May 1997) is a Dutch professional footballer who plays as a midfielder for La Liga club Barcelona and the Netherlands national team. A versatile midfielder, he is known for his vision, passing, dribbling, technique, along with strong defensive abilities and attacking prowess. De Jong has frequently been ranked among the best midfielders in world football.

De Jong began his professional career at Willem II in 2015. He transferred to Ajax for a fee worth €1 a year later. The fee was symbolic and offset by a sell-on clause. At Ajax he established himself as one of the best young midfielders in Europe, after winning a domestic double and reaching the Champions League semi-finals. De Jong won the Eredivisie and KNVB Cup, was Eredivisie player of the season, and was an instrumental part of Ajax's first UEFA Champions League semi-final appearance in 22 years, in a breakthrough 2018–19 season.

During his breakthrough season, De Jong agreed to sign for Barcelona in January 2019, leading him to be signed for the club in July, for a fee worth €75 million. De Jong was selected to the 2019 FIFA FIFPro World11 and was one of three Dutch players to feature in it for the first time in five years.

De Jong made his senior international debut for the Netherlands in September 2018. He became a starter in the inaugural UEFA Nations League, in which Netherlands finished runners-up. He also represented the side at UEFA Euro 2020 and the 2022 FIFA World Cup.

Club career

Willem II
A product of Willem II, de Jong played through the entire youth system at the club. On 10 May 2015, De Jong made his Eredivisie debut against ADO Den Haag, two days before his eighteenth birthday. He was substituted in the 68th minute for Terell Ondaan in a (1–0) home win.

Ajax
At the beginning of the season, on 22 August 2015, Ajax purchased De Jong. He signed a four-year contract, for a symbolic €1 fee which included a 10% sell-on bonus. On 23 August 2015, he was loaned back to Willem II until 31 December 2015. During this time he made one substitute appearance in an Eredivisie match against PEC Zwolle.

2016–2019: Development and first-team regular

For the first two years at Ajax, De Jong was in and out of the first team squad. After returning to the club in January 2016, de Jong made 15 appearances in the 2015—16 Eerste Divisie for Ajax II. He primarily played in the centre of a three-man midfield and scored two goals. The following year, he was awarded the 2016–17 Eerste Divisie's Talent of the season award for his performances with Ajax II for whom, he made 31 first team appearances and played as a central, and defensive, midfielder.

He made his senior debut against Sparta Rotterdam coming on, in the 88th minute, for Lasse Schöne. In total, he made four senior appearances for Ajax, and scored one goal against Go Ahead Eagles, in the 2016—17 season. He started one game, came off the bench thrice, and was an unused substitute in 13 games. He also made his European debut and made four substitute, and three bench, appearances, in the 2016–17 Europa League. He came off the bench in the 82nd minute against Manchester United in the final. It was Ajax's first European final in 21 years.

Aged 20, he made 26 appearances for the first team. Primarily he featured as a center-back, in a back four, alongside national teammate Matthijs de Ligt due to the departure of Davinson Sanchez. He also played in a three-man center-midfield. He recorded eight assists in 22 league appearances and received two yellow cards. Towards the end of the season he was injured—tendonitis, syndesmotic ligament tear, hairline crack in calf bone—and missed three months. De Jong made two substitute appearances in the 2017–18 Champions League qualification, as Ajax lost on away goals against Nice (3–3) in the third qualifying round.

In the 2018–19 season, he primarily played in the middle of a three-man midfield. De Jong was the Eredivisie player of the month in December (2018) and February (2019)—in which he completed 354 of 390 passes and made 53 ball recoveries. Later that month he received praise from Rafael Van Der Vaart, who said De Jong was among the best players in Europe with the ball at his feet. It is unclear whether during or prior to the beginning of the campaign he rejected an offer from Tottenham Hotspur, saying the "moment wasn't right," and wanted to play a full season in his preferred position at Ajax.

De Jong achieved success, and widespread recognition, during the 2018–19 season and led Ajax to their first domestic double (league and cup) since the 2001–02 season. Ajax wrestled with PSV Eindhoven all season for the league, and finished the last five weeks at the top of the table. He made 51 total appearances and starred in Ajax's first leg (0–1) win over Tottenham Hotspur in the 2018–19 UEFA Champions League semi-final at Tottenham Hotspur Stadium—in which De Jong had the most touches by any player on the pitch (87) and an 86.2 percent pass completion rate. It was the first time Ajax made the tournament semi-final since 1997. The team eliminated Juventus (3–2 on agg.) in the quarterfinals and Real Madrid (5–3 on agg.) In the second leg of the semi-final, Ajax lost 2–3 at home and were knocked out on away goals to English club Tottenham Hotspur. De Jong was selected to the 2018–19 UEFA Champions League squad of the season and voted the tournament's midfielder of the season.

Barcelona
On 23 January 2019, La Liga club Barcelona announced the signing of de Jong on a five-year contract, effective from 1 July 2019, for an initial fee worth €75 million. De Jong had transfer discussions with Paris Saint-Germain and Manchester City and Manchester United before ultimately opting for Barcelona. He made his competitive debut on 16 August 2019, in a 0–1 opening day defeat to Athletic Bilbao.

He played a crucial role in the 2021 Copa del Rey final, a 4–0 win over Athletic Bilbao, scoring in the 63rd minute and assisting two further goals.

International career
De Jong made eight appearances for the Netherlands under-19 team, with his debut coming against Russia on 7 July 2015. He made six appearances and scored one goal for the Netherlands at under-21 level. On 6 September 2018, de Jong replaced Georginio Wijnaldum at half-time to make his senior international debut in a friendly (2–1) win against Peru. Fifteen minutes into his debut, he assisted a goal for Memphis Depay by retrieving possession high-up the pitch and setting up the forward. He later on scored the winner, and had a 100 percent pass completion rate (21 passes) in the opposition half. He soon became a regular starter for the Netherlands in the 2018–19 UEFA Nations League and the UEFA Euro 2020 qualifiers. He was included in the UEFA Euro 2020 and 2022 FIFA World Cup. In the latter, he scored his first goal in the competition, netting in a 2–0 victory against the host of the tournament Qatar in the group stage.

Style of play
Frenkie has described himself as a player "who likes to have the ball a lot, and play possession." A versatile player, De Jong can function as a regista, defensive midfielder, central midfielder, holding midfielder, box-to-box midfielder and centre back. He has been lauded for his combination of defensive stability and playmaking ability. He often partnered Matthijs de Ligt at centre-back, at Ajax. As a centre back, he abstained from committing fouls, showed great positional sense, and won possession frequently. In this more defensive role, his performances led to comparison with former German sweeper Franz Beckenbauer and likened his tendency to progress forward in possession, and ability to play-make, from defense to the German legend.De Jong's vision has been praised alongside his ability to dribble in narrow spaces, control over possession, and decisive passing. A natural dribbler, De Jong has the highest dribbling success of all players to participate in all competitions, during his last season with Ajax. An extraordinary game-reader, he often makes offensive runs through the middle.

His other attributes include a penchant for long cross-field passes, creating space, and absorbing attacking pressure. His close control, accuracy, work rate, and movement has drawn comparisons with Andrés Iniesta and Johan Cruyff. At Barcelona, he has primarily played on either side of a three-man central midfield. This has led experts and former players to regard him as a player with "Barça DNA" who was "born to play for Barcelona."

Personal life 
De Jong was born in Gorinchem and grew up in Arkel, a town in the province of South Holland, where he started playing football at a young age. Since he started playing professionally, De Jong has chosen 21 on his shirt as a tribute to his grandfather who was born on 21 April.
He met his fiancée Mikky Kiemeney in high school and they have been dating since 2014. The couple became engaged in July 2022.

Career statistics

Club

International

Scores and results list Netherlands' goal tally first, score column indicates score after each De Jong goal.

Honours
Ajax
Eredivisie: 2018–19
KNVB Cup: 2018–19
UEFA Europa League runner-up: 2016–17

Barcelona
Copa del Rey: 2020–21
Supercopa de España: 2022–23

Netherlands
UEFA Nations League runner-up: 2018–19

Individual
Eerste Divisie Talent of the Season: 2016–17
Eredivisie Player of the Month: December 2018, February 2019
Eredivisie Player of the Season: 2018–19
Eredivisie Team of the Season: 2018–19
UEFA Champions League Squad of the Season: 2018–19
UEFA Champions League Midfielder of the Season: 2018–19
Johan Cruyff Trophy: 2018–19
UEFA Nations League Finals Young Player of the Tournament: 2019
UEFA Nations League Finals Team of the Tournament: 2019
FIFA FIFPro World11: 2019
IFFHS Men's World Team: 2019
UEFA Team of the Year: 2019
Premi Barça Jugadors (Barça Players Award): 2020–21

References

External links

Profile at the FC Barcelona website

1997 births
Living people
Footballers from Gorinchem
Dutch footballers
Association football midfielders
Willem II (football club) players
AFC Ajax players
Jong Ajax players
FC Barcelona players
Eredivisie players
Eerste Divisie players
La Liga players
Netherlands youth international footballers
Netherlands under-21 international footballers
Netherlands international footballers
UEFA Euro 2020 players
2022 FIFA World Cup players
Dutch expatriate footballers
Expatriate footballers in Spain
Dutch expatriate sportspeople in Spain